Rebecca Roanhorse (born March 14, 1971) is an American science fiction and fantasy writer from New Mexico. She has written short stories and science fiction novels featuring Navajo characters. Her work has received Hugo and Nebula awards, among others.

Background and family
Roanhorse was born Rebecca Parish in Conway, Arkansas in 1971. Raised in northern Texas, she has said that "being a black and Native kid in Fort Worth in the '70s and '80s was pretty limiting"; thus, she turned to reading and writing, especially science fiction, as a form of escape. Her father was an economics professor, and her mother was a high school English teacher who encouraged Rebecca's early attempts at writing stories.

She was adopted as a child by white parents. In a 2020 profile by Vulture Magazine, she said that at 7 years old she learned from looking at her birth certificate that she is "half-Black and half–Spanish Indian". She reunited with her birth mother later in life, though they rarely speak. Roanhorse has said that she is of Ohkay Owingeh Pueblo and African American descent, though she is not an enrolled tribal member. Members of the Ohkay Owingeh community have disputed her claim, saying she has no connection to their community.

Roanhorse graduated from Yale University and later earned her JD degree from the University of New Mexico School of Law, specializing in Federal Indian Law and lived for several years on the Navajo Nation, where she clerked at the Navajo Supreme Court before working as an attorney. She currently lives in New Mexico with her husband, who is Navajo, and their daughter.

Career
Roanhorse told The New York Times that she initially worked on "Tolkien knockoffs about white farm boys going on journeys", because she figured that is what readers wanted.

On August 19, 2020, Roanhorse was announced as a contributing writer to Marvel Comics' Marvel's Voices: Indigenous Voices #1 anthology, which was released in November 2020. She wrote a story about Echo, joined by Weshoyot Alvitre on art.

Reception 
In 2018 Roanhorse received the Astounding Award for Best New Writer. Her short story "Welcome to Your Authentic Indian Experience" (Apex Magazine 2017) won two major awards: the 2018 Hugo Award for Best Short Story and the 2017 Nebula Award for Best Short Story. The story also earned her nominations for the 2018 Locus Award for Best Short Story, the 2018 Theodore Sturgeon Award, and the 2018 World Fantasy Award for Best Short Fiction.

Her first novel, Trail of Lightning, is an "apocalyptic adventure" set in Dinétah, formerly the Navajo reservation in the Southwestern United States, with mostly Navajo characters. The novel received significant critical acclaim. Kirkus Reviews described the book as a "sharp, wonderfully dreamy, action-driven novel," while The Verge praised the book's representation of Native cultures, saying it "takes readers along for a fun ride." It went on to win the 2019 Locus Award for Best First Novel, as well as receive nominations for the 2018 Nebula Award for Best Novel, the 2019 Hugo Award for Best Novel, and the 2019 World Fantasy Award for Best Novel.

However, it has been criticized by Navajo/Diné and other Native authors, scholars, and activists, who have argued that, due to a lack of cultural connection, it misrepresents Navajo teachings and spirituality, disrespects Navajo sensibilities, and harms Navajo culture. A group of Navajo writers and cultural workers condemned Trail of Lightning as an inaccurate cultural appropriation that uses an at-times mocking and derisive tone. For example, they criticized the hero's use of bullets filled with corn pollen to slay the monster, which they viewed as a violent, disrespectful misuse of sacred ceremonial traditions. When asked in a Reddit AMA about including Navajo cultural aspects into her works, Roanhorse said her goal was "accuracy and respect" and gave examples of what she fictionalized and what she considered off-limits. "I think a lot of Native characters that we see are stuck in the past. So it was important for me to...show Native American readers and non-Native American readers that we're alive and we're thriving in our cultures", she said in 2018. 

Prominent Native scholar Debbie Reese (Nambé Pueblo) initially praised Trail of Lightning, but upon hearing from Diné writers, poets and academics, she changed her mind about the book, writing that she'd "come to understand that Roanhorse had crossed the Diné’s 'lines of disclosure,' an offense that many white interlopers had committed in the past." She retracted the review and criticized Roanhorse for sharing ideas outside the culture and misusing sacred stories. Critics argue that because the Indigenous community that Roanhorse has claimed does not claim her, this makes her non-Indigenous. Her defenders do not question her claims of Black Indigenous heritage and have expressed concern that questions about her identity are either racist or a distraction from discussions of her work's content. Others have discussed anti-Blackness within Indigenous communities and how this may impact critiques of Roanhorse. At some point in 2018, when the complaints of cultural appropriation surfaced, references to the Ohkay Owingeh were removed from her official website; Roanhorse has stated that she believes her mother's family descended from Ohkay Owingeh people but is "trying to be more careful" about how she discusses it.

Awards and nominations

Bibliography

Novels 
 Star Wars: Resistance Reborn (November 5, 2019)
 Race to the Sun (January 14, 2020)

The Sixth World series 
 Trail of Lightning (June 26, 2018)
 Storm of Locusts (April 23, 2019)

Between Earth and Sky 
 Black Sun (October 13, 2020)
 Fevered Star (April 19, 2022)

Novellas 
 Tread of Angels ( November 15, 2022)

Short stories and essays 
 "Native in Space" in Invisible 3: Essays and Poems on Representation in SF/F, edited by Jim Hines and Mary Anne Mohanraj (June 27, 2017)
"Welcome to Your Authentic Indian Experience" in Apex Magazine (August 8, 2017)
"Postcards from the Apocalypse" in Uncanny Magazine (January/February 2018)
"Thoughts on Resistance" in How I Resist: Activism and Hope for a New Generation, edited by Maureen Johnson (2018)
"Harvest" originally published  in New Suns: Original Speculative Fiction by People of Color, edited by Nisi Shawl (March 12, 2019) and reprinted in Uncanny Magazine (2019)
"The Missing Ingredient" in Hungry Hearts: 13 Tales of Food & Love, edited by Caroline Tung Richmond and Elsie Chapman (July 7, 2019)
"A Brief Lesson in Native American Astronomy" originally published in The Mythic Dream (September 3, 2019) and reprinted in Apex Magazine (October 2, 2021) and The Best American Science Fiction and Fantasy 2020, edited by Diana Gabaldon and John Joseph Adams (October 6, 2020)
"Dark Vengeance" in Star Wars: The Clone Wars: Stories of Light and Dark (August 25, 2020)
"The Boys from Blood River" in Vampires Never Get Old: Tales with Fresh Bite, edited by Zoraida Córdova and Natalie C. Parker (September 22, 2020)
"Takeback Tango" in A Universe of Wishes: A We Need Diverse Books Anthology, edited by Dhonielle Clayton (December 8, 2020)
"Rez Dog Rules" in Ancestor Approved: Intertribal Stories for Kids, edited by Cynthia L. Smith (February 9, 2021)
"Wherein Abigail Fields Recalls Her First Death and, Subsequently Her Best Life" in A Phoenix First Must Burn: Sixteen Stories of Black Girl Magic, Resistance, and Hope, edited by Patrice Caldwell (March 10, 2021)
"The Demon Drum" in The Cursed Carnival and Other Calamities: New Stories About Mythic Heroes, edited by Rick Riordan (September 28, 2021)

Marvel Comics 
 Marvel's Voices
 Indigenous Voices (November 18, 2020)
 Heritage (January 12, 2022)
 Phoenix Song: Echo #1–5 (October 20, 2021 – February 23, 2022)

Notes

References

External links

Living people
1971 births
African-American women writers
African-American writers
American women writers
American people who self-identify as being of Native American descent
Black speculative fiction authors
Hugo Award-winning writers
John W. Campbell Award for Best New Writer winners
American science fiction writers
People from Conway, Arkansas
People from Fort Worth, Texas
Nebula Award winners
Women science fiction and fantasy writers